Eito Yasutoko is a Japanese professional vert skater. Eito won a gold medal at the 2003 Gravity Games and a gold medal at the 2005 X Games in England.

His brother is professional vert skater Takeshi Yasutoko.

Best Tricks Twister, 1080 California Roll, Double backflip 180.

Vert Competitions 
2014 Asian X Games, Shanghai, China - Vert: Silver
2013 Asian X Games, Shanghai, China - Vert: Gold
2010 Asian X Games, Shanghai, China - Vert: Bronze
2008 Asian X Games, Shanghai - Vert: 2nd
2007 LG Action Sports World Championships, Dallas, TX - Vert: Bronze Medalist
2007 Action Sports World Tour, San Diego, CA - Vert: 3rd
2007 Asian X Games, Shanghai - Vert: 3rd
2006 LG Action Sports World Championships, Dallas, TX - Vert: 9th
2006 LG Action Sports World Tour, Birmingham, England - Vert: 4th
2006 LG Action Sports World Tour, Amsterdam, Netherlands - Vert: 8th
2006 Action Sports World Tour, Richmond, VA - Vert: 2nd
2006 Asian X Games, Kuala Lumpur, Malaysia - Vert: 1st
2005 LG Action Sports World Championship, Manchester, England: 1st
2005 LG Action Sports US Championship, Pomona, CA - Vert: 2nd
2005 LG Action Sports World Tour, Munich, Germany - Vert: 2nd
2005 LG Action Sports World Tour, Moscow, Russia - Vert: 1st
2004 Pro Tour Year-End Ranking - Vert: 2
2004 LG Action Sports Asian Tour, Beijing, China: 1st, Shanghai & Seoul: 2nd
2004 LG Action Sports Championships - World Championships - Vert: 5th
2004 X Games - Vert: Bronze Medalist
2004 Asian X Games: Silver Medalist
2003 Pro Tour Year-End Ranking (Vert): 1
2003 LG Action Sports Championships - World Championships - Vert: 1st
2003 Gravity Games - Vert: Gold Medalist
2003 X Games - Vert: Gold Medalist
2003 AIL - Vert: 2
2002 X Games - Vert: Silver Medalist
2001 ASA World Championships - Vert: Bronze Medalist
2001 AIL - Vert: 4
2000 X Games - Vert: Gold Medalist
1999 AIL - Vert: 1
1999 AIL - Vert Triples: 3
1998 AIL - Vert: 4
1998 AIL - Vert Triples: 5

References

External links
eitoyasutoko
actionsportstour
rollernews
grindtv
allamericanspeakers
inlineskating
expn.go.com

1983 births
Living people
Vert skaters
X Games athletes